Scythris onerica is a moth species of the family Scythrididae. It was described by Kari Nupponen in 2009. It is found in south-western Kazakhstan. The habitat consists of desert steppes.

Etymology
The species name refers to Oneri spring, the type locality.

References

onerica
Moths described in 2009
Moths of Asia